Oxatomide, sold under the brand name Tinset among others, is a first-generation antihistamine of the diphenylmethylpiperazine family which is marketed in Europe, Japan, and a number of other countries. It was discovered at Janssen Pharmaceutica in 1975. Oxatomide lacks any anticholinergic effects. In addition to its H1 receptor antagonism, it also possesses antiserotonergic activity similarly to hydroxyzine.

It was patented in 1976 and came into medical use in 1981.

Chemistry

Synthesis

Reaction of 2-Benzimidazolinone with isopropenyl acetate leads to the singly protected imidazolone derivative (2). Alkylation of this with 3-chloro-1-bromopropane affords the functionalized derivative (3). Alkylation of the monobenzhydryl derivative of piperazine (4) with 3 gives oxatomide (5), after hydrolytic removal of the protecting group.

References

Benzimidazoles
Belgian inventions
H1 receptor antagonists
Janssen Pharmaceutica
Gamma-lactams
Cyclizines
Ureas